Consolidated may refer to:

Consolidated (band)
¡Consolidated!, a 1989 extended play
Consolidated Aircraft (later Convair), an aircraft manufacturer
Consolidated city-county
Consolidated Communications
Consolidated school district
Consolidated Foods

See also

Consolidation (disambiguation)